The best man is the first attendant to the groom, in a wedding party.

Best man may also refer to:

Films
The Best Man, a 1916 film starting Victor Moore
The Best Man (1964 film), an adaptation of the Gore Vidal play
The Best Man (1998 film), also called Il testimone dello sposo, an Italian film
The Best Man (1999 film), starring Taye Diggs, Nia Long, and Morris Chestnut
The Best Man (2005 film), starring Stuart Townsend

Literature
The Best Man (play), 1960 play by Gore Vidal
"The Best Man" (1905), short story by Edith Wharton

Music
The Best Man (EP), a 2014 mini-album by Wheesung
"The Best Man" (song), a single from Blaine Larsen's 2004 album Off to Join the World

Television
 "Best Man" (The King of Queens), a 1999 episode
 "The Best Man" (How I Met Your Mother), a 2011 episode